Stara Ruda  is a village in the administrative district of Gmina Radzyń Chełmiński, within Grudziądz County, Kuyavian-Pomeranian Voivodeship, in north-central Poland.

During the German occupation of Poland (World War II), in 1939, the Germans carried out a massacre of several Poles from Stara Ruda, Radzyń Chełmiński and other nearby settlements in the forest of Stara Ruda, as part of the Intelligenzaktion.

References

Stara Ruda
Massacres of Poles
Nazi war crimes in Poland